Jabara Williams (born July 6, 1989) is a former American football linebacker. He was drafted by the St. Louis Rams in the seventh round of the 2011 NFL Draft. He played college football at Stephen F. Austin. He played high school football at Garrison High School.

He also played for the Chicago Bears.

College career
At Stephen F. Austin Williams was a two-time All-America selection, he was also a Southland Conference Defensive Player of the Year and a three-time First-team All-Southland Conference selection.

Following a freshman campaign that saw him start both as a linebacker and running back in which he made 58 tackles, he went on to lead the SLC in tackles in 2008 with 132. As a junior, in 2009, he made 113 tackles (9.5 for losses) and deflected 7 passes. As a senior in 2010, he made 108 tackles (6.5 for losses) and 5 passes defensed.  He ended his college career with 411 career tackles, while leading Stephen F. Austin to back-to-back conference titles for the first time in school history.

Professional career

St. Louis Rams
Williams was selected by the St. Louis Rams in the seventh round of the 2011 NFL Draft. He was waived on October 26, 2011.

Chicago Bears
The Chicago Bears claimed him off waivers on October 27. He was waived on August 31, 2012.

St. Louis Rams
On November 22, 2012, the St. Louis Rams signed Williams to their practice squad. On August 27, 2013, he was cut by the Rams.

Dallas Cowboys
On January 8, 2014 the Dallas Cowboys signed Jabara Williams to reserve/futures contracts.  On May 12, 2014 the Dallas Cowboys released Jabara Williams.

References

External links
 
 Stephen F. Austin Lumberjacks bio

1989 births
Living people
Players of American football from Texas
American football linebackers
Stephen F. Austin Lumberjacks football players
St. Louis Rams players
Chicago Bears players